ŠK Nová Dedinka is a Slovak football team, based in the town of Nová Dedinka. The club was founded in 1933. Club colors are blue and white. ŠK Nová Dedinka home stadium is Futbalové ihrisko ŠK Nová Dedinka with a capacity of 1,000 spectators.

Current squad

Staff

Current technical staff

Historical names
 ŠK Nová Dedinka (?–present)

External links 

 Futbalnet profile   
  

Football clubs in Slovakia
Association football clubs established in 1933
1933 establishments in Slovakia